Ed Coleman (born 1949 in Lawrence, Massachusetts) is a radio reporter for the New York Mets on WFAN.

Early life
Coleman graduated from Syracuse University in 1971.

Career

WFAN
Ed started his career on WFAN as Steve Somers' overnight update person in the 1980s before moving on and being replaced by Suzyn Waldman. 
In the early 1990s, he co-hosted WFAN's midday show with Dave Sims. The show was nicknamed the Coleman and the Soul Man. When the show was canceled he was reassigned as WFAN's New York Mets beat reporter. Coleman's duties were expanded to being host of Mets Extra (and later a fill-in play-by-play) when former host Howie Rose was hired to do play-by-play for the Mets and the Islanders games on SportsChannel New York. Coleman continues to host programs periodically throughout the baseball off-season as well as a weekly program on Sunday afternoon or evening during the National Football League regular season.  The NFL in Action features live updates from field reporters at the various NFL games occurring live at that time as well as game recaps of completed games.

Olympics
Coleman did some radio work for the 1988 and 1992 Summer Olympics, as well as the 1994 Winter Olympics.  His big break in radio came in 1982, when he was the sports announcer during morning drive at WCAP, Lowell, Massachusetts after a stint at the short-lived Enterprise Radio Network.  Coleman became a beloved person in the Lowell community, where the Spindle City Press Association's highest award is the Ed Coleman Award for journalistic achievement.

References

External links
WFAN profile

American radio sports announcers
Major League Baseball broadcasters
New York Mets announcers
1949 births
Living people
People from Lawrence, Massachusetts
Place of birth missing (living people)